Baruch Adonai L'Olam may refer to:

 Baruch Adonai L'Olam (Maariv)
 Baruch Adonai L'Olam (Shacharit)